Juan & Ted: Wanted is a 2000 Philippine comedy film directed by Al Tantay. The film stars Janno Gibbs and Bayani Agbayani as the title roles.

The film is streaming online on YouTube.

Plot
Fugitives Juancho (Janno Gibbs) and Ted (Bayani Agbayani), escape jail and their captors, Hepe (Jovit Moya) and Sgt. Langku (Boy Alano). They integrate into society by working as a school bus driver and conductor. As an incentive, Ted is allowed to continue with his education while Juancho works double time with his education and aids him with his other needs in school. They also develop a special bond with the students, whom they realize have problems of their own. They soon decide to go AWOL in order to take a break from their problems. As they try to return to school, they are intercepted by a gang of bank robbers who take them hostage. But Juan and Ted incites the students to start a riot, disorienting the robbers and causing the bus to teeter on the edge of the ravine. All the passengers escape before the bus plunges and explodes at the bottom, but Juan and Ted are arrested again when the police arrive. However, they are released on their trial when it is revealed that they were framed by their arresting officers for kidnapping.

Cast
Janno Gibbs as Juancho
Bayani Agbayani as Ted
Anne Curtis as Hazel
Maureen Larrazabal as Nurse Suzy
Vanna Garcia as Miki
Angela Velez as Vivien
Carla Guevarra as Sarah
Jovit Moya as Hepe
Boy Alano as Sgt. Langku
Inday Badiday as Judge
Inday Garutay as Stenographer
Chubi del Rosario as Roberto
JR Trinidad as Chito
Marky Lopez as Mon
Rico J. Puno as Mr. Mariano
Dan Salamante
Hyubs Azarcon as Nick
Kuhol as Pong
Dagul as Chuck
Al Tantay as Father of Roberto

References

External links 
 
Full Movie on Viva Films

2000 films
Philippine action comedy films
2000 comedy films
2000s Tagalog-language films
Films directed by Al Tantay